Altavilla Milicia is a comune (municipality) in the Metropolitan City of Palermo in the Italian region Sicily, located about  southeast of Palermo.

The Commune is named after the Hauteville family, Norman Settlers who conquered Sicily in the 11th century and later became the ruling dynasty of the island.  The name Altavilla is an Italian translation of the French Hauteville. The feudal Barony and the Duchy of Altavilla later passed into the hands of the Adragna family.

One of the sights is the Sanctuary of the "Madonna della Milicia".

Altavilla Milicia borders the municipalities of Casteldaccia and Trabia.

References

External links 
 Portal of Altavilla Milicia
 Portal of  Sanctuary of Madonna della Milicia

Municipalities of the Metropolitan City of Palermo
Articles which contain graphical timelines